This is an incomplete list of fictional holidays and list of fictional holidays created by fictional characters.

List
Summerween - A holiday similar to Halloween, but taking place during the Summer, celebrated on June 22. - Gravity Falls
Durin's Day - Dwarven equivalent of New Year's Day. The secret entrance to the Lonely Mountain becomes visible. - The Hobbit
Weasel Stomping Day - Day in unnamed fictional town that celebrated when every one spreads mayonnaise on the lawn, puts on Viking helmets and boots, then proceeds to kill weasels by stepping on them - "Weird Al" Yankovic song of the same name, also Robot Chicken.
Whacking Day - The day (May 10) where everybody beats snakes to death with clubs - The Simpsons
Hogswatch in Wincanton Somerset England Discworld. 
Decemberween - Fictionalized Christmas-Halloween hybrid, celebrated on December 25 - Homestar Runner
Freedom Day - Counterpart of American Independence Day celebrated in 3000's Earth, with the saying If you wanna do something, you do it, and to spleckh with the consequences. - Futurama
Emperor's Day - Similar to Christmas, gifts are placed in bowls rather than stockings. - Warhammer 40,000
Winter Veil - Celebrated on December 25, it is the Azerothian equivalent of Christmas - Warcraft
Harry Potter Day, the day that Harry Potter defeated an evil wizard in the Harry Potter books. This day is actually Halloween, and referred as such in all the books.
Black Drinking Day - An African-American day, (October 7, started in 2009) dedicated to drinking alcoholic beverages. - The Tonight Show with Conan O'Brien
Birillmayen - A stupid but fun holiday invented to combine the best aspects of Birthdays, Halloween, and Christmas. It is celebrated on the 27th of November.
Black Jewish Drinking Day - A Jewish day, (October 12, started in 2009) given to African-Americans, dedicated to drinking alcoholic beverages. - The Tonight Show with Conan O'Brien
Vermintide - Celebrated every 13 years, the Chaos moon is full for 13 days in a row. the Skaven hold many ceremonies dedicated to their patron deity, the Horned Rat. - Warhammer
Friend Appreciation Day - Celebrated by showing your friends how much you love them and exchanging gifts. - Harvey Street Kids (now known as Harvey Girls Forever!)
Colonial Day - Commemorates the signing of the Articles of Colonization which incorporated the Twelve Colonies of Man during the First Cylon War. - Battlestar Galactica reimagining
Australian Christmas - [Fictional] Australian Christmas version in Team Fortress 2. Every December the 17th, children in Australia make weapons and hats for Old Nick, a crotchety old man who lives at the South Pole. After receiving all of his gifts, Old Nick realizes he received many duplicates of gifts, so he sells them off for incredibly low prices!
Sadie Hawkins Day - Pseudo-holiday that originated in Al Capp's classic hillbilly comic strip, Li'l Abner (1934–1978). This inspired real-world Sadie Hawkins dances, where girls ask boys out.
 First Contact Day - Commemorating the first contact between humans and Vulcans on 5 April 2063 in Star Trek
 Federation Day - Second Monday in October (Earth Calendar), Commemorating the founding of the United Federation of Planets on October 9, 2161 (date is non-canon) in Star Trek
 Barzzle Snurfing Day - Holiday originating in the Facebook community that celebrates the first internet meme to waste an entire day's productivity being forwarded among co-workers. Since no one knows exactly when this was, the holiday is declared randomly each year by the same committee that determines when "celebrity look-alike" week and "love your sibling" day are. If a consensus cannot be reached by the fall equinox in the northern hemisphere, the holiday by default falls on the first day after the first full moon in the next month to contain 5 Saturdays (even if that day occurs in the following year).
 Heaven's Day - Essentially Christmas with a different name. Alex Rosewater even states that it's the day God's son was born. - The Big O
 Lady Hewitt Smythe Day - A holiday that is celebrated with an annual game played similar to croquet and polo whilst riding on elephants. - Mike, Lu & Og
 Unification Day - A celebration of the Alliance's victory over the Browncoats in the Unification War. According to Nathan Fillion, the main actor in Firefly, the holiday is on September 20. - Firefly
 Hurling Day - (Jim Henson's Dinosaurs) Established by a wise but aging dinosaur chief during the days when dinosaurs roamed in tribes, Hurling Day served to prevent elderly tribe members from slowing down the pack, and allowed them to depart the mortal coil with dignity. Thus, upon turning 72, old dinosaurs were to be ceremonially pushed off a cliff by their closest family in a loving and respectful manner. Hurling Day soon became popular, however, as a means by which husbands could finally take revenge on their mothers-in-law. - Jim Henson's Dinosaurs
 Clearance Day - A holiday, founded by calendar-maker Clarence von Clearance, similar to Christmas and Thanksgiving where families and friends gather to celebrate commercialism and sales. People celebrate by purchasing gifts for one another, placing them under the Clearance Day anvil, and exchanging whatever survives the weight of the anvil in the morning. Celebrated sometime in August. - Sheep in the Big City
 The Purge - On March 21, all crime is legal for 12 hours and government services are shut down. Government officials with "authorization levels" of ranking 10 or higher are granted immunity from the purge Weapons of class 5 or higher. Explosive devices such as grenades, rocket launchers, bazookas, etc., weapons of mass destruction, and viral/biological and chemical agents is prohibited. - The Purge

Fictional holidays created by characters 
Denzel Crocker Day - On March 15, 1972, everyone in Dimmsdale celebrates the achievements of Denzel Crocker. It's also the day that Mr. Crocker lost his fairy godparents. In the events of The Fairly Odd Parents, it's the day when Mr. Crocker is at his meanest.
Dogbert Day - from Dilbert animated TV show, created by Dogbert as a holiday designed to replace all holidays and be incredibly bothersome while doing so. It includes elements from all normal holidays, including big dinners, a parade and "visits from unpleasant relatives", and some that derive from Druid holidays, such as virgin sacrifice.
Robanukah - robot holiday made up by Bender as an excuse for not working. The characters later decide to actually celebrate it - by "doing the robot dance", with Jewish-style music playing in the background. - Futurama
Do Nothing Day - made up by Nobita who uses one of Doraemon's magical gadgets to declare it. -Doraemon
Winter-een-mas - a multi-day January holiday invented by Ethan in the Ctrl+Alt+Del webcomic to celebrate video games. Within the webcomic, it turned into a surprise hit and even led to a brief kidnapping plot when a corporation wanted to take advantage of its popularity.
Scotchtoberfest - pun from Oktoberfest, create by Skinner made up "Scotchtoberfest" as part of a sting to catch Bart in the act of breaking the rules. Finding out that it was in fact not a real holiday did not sit well with Groundskeeper Willie. - The Simpsons
Merlinpeen, a festival of mouth pleasure from "Secret Santa" along with fictional religion "Verdukianism" create by Frank, Toofer, and Lutz from 30 Rock  have Kenneth give them things they claim to need for "Merlinpeen," the Verdukian Holiday of Mouth Pleasures (such as three-sausage pizza and having their teeth flossed by a blonde virgin). Their famous holiday song is, "Oh, Meatbowl of Verduke, you bring me such pizza. Meatbowl." When Tracy Jordan (Tracy Morgan) tells Kenneth that they made up their religion, he goes into shock at the idea that all religions are made up by man. - 30 Rock
Annoy Squidward Day - A holiday marked on SpongeBob's calendar. Apparently involves bothering his neighbor and coworker, Squidward Tentacles, for most of the day. Celebrated on February 15. - SpongeBob SquarePants
Hive Day, an annual technology release party from HiveTech on September 29, from the book Hive Propolis by Daniel D.W.
Yay Day, Cat Valentine dreams up a new holiday as an exchange gift - Sam & Cat
Galactic Empire Day, a celebration of the end of the Clone Wars in Star Wars.
Some commentators suggest that fictional holidays, particularly in television shows' Christmas episodes, have become one of the many clichés. Meredith Blake in the Los Angeles Times said about Merlinpeen, "here we have yet another Christmas television trope: the goofy, made-up holiday. See 
also: 'Chrismukkah', 'Cthulhumas' and 'Festivus.' It's a favorite device of TV writers, but I'm not sure why."

References

 
Fictional
Fictional
Entertainment lists
Holidays
Holidays